Håkan Lidman (31 January 1915 – 6 June 2000) was a Swedish hurdler who specialized in the 110 m event. He competed at the 1936 and 1948 Summer Olympics and finished fourth and sixth, respectively. He won two medals at the European championships: a gold in 1946 and a silver in 1938. In 1940 he set a European record at 14.0 and was awarded the Svenska Dagbladet Gold Medal. Lidman held the Swedish 110 m hurdles title in 1935–45 and 1947–1948. After retiring from competitions he served as director of the Swedish Athletics Association.

References

1915 births
2000 deaths
Swedish male hurdlers
Olympic athletes of Sweden
Athletes (track and field) at the 1936 Summer Olympics
Athletes (track and field) at the 1948 Summer Olympics
European Athletics Championships medalists